Necropolis is a Gothic novel by author Basil Copper. It was published by Arkham House in 1980 in an edition of 4,050 copies. It was Copper's third book published by Arkham House.

Plot summary

The novel is set in Victorian England. Clyde Beatty, a private investigator, is hired by Angela Meredith to investigate her father's death. His investigations lead him to a nursing home in Surrey, directed by the sinister Dr. Horace Couchman. After an autopsy reveals the murder of Miss Meredith's father, Dr. Couchman flees to London leading Beatty eventually to the eerie Brockwood Cemetery and a criminal conspiracy involving millions of pounds' worth of gold bullion.

Reprints

Arkham House
Second Printing, 1981 – 1,539 copies.

Valancourt Books
In 2013 Valancourt Books reissued Necropolis with Stephen E. Fabian's illustrations and a new introduction by Stephen Jones.

Others
London: Sphere, 1981.

References

1980 American novels
British Gothic novels
British mystery novels
Novels set in London
Novels set in Surrey
Arkham House books